

Acts of Senedd Cymru

|-
| {{|Welsh Tax Acts etc. (Power to Modify) Act 2022|cyshort=Deddf Deddfau Trethi Cymru etc. (Pŵer i Addasu) 2022|asc|2|08-09-2022|maintained=y|archived=n|An Act of Senedd Cymru to confer on the Welsh Ministers a power to modify the Welsh Tax Acts and regulations made under those Acts for specified purposes; and to make provision for connected purposes.|cylong=Deddf gan Senedd Cymru i roi pŵer i Weinidogion Cymru i addasu Deddfau Trethi Cymru a rheoliadau a wneir o dan y Deddfau hynny at ddibenion penodedig; ac i wneud darpariaeth at ddibenion cysylltiedig.}}
}}

References

2022